Dragan Sudžum (born 28 April 1978) is a Serbian handball coach and former player.

Club career
Over the course of his career that spanned two decades, Sudžum played for Sintelon, Partizan (two spells), TuS Nettelstedt-Lübbecke (Germany), Pilotes Posada (Spain), Vojvodina, Jugović, and Lavovi BP.

In March 2016, Sudžum came out of retirement to play for his former club Lavovi BP.

International career
At international level, Sudžum represented Serbia and Montenegro (previously known as FR Yugoslavia) in four major tournaments, making his debut at the 1998 European Championship.

Sudžum won the gold medal at the 1998 World University Championship.

Honours
Sintelon
 Handball Cup of FR Yugoslavia: 1999–2000
Partizan
 Serbian Handball Cup: 2007–08
Vojvodina
 Serbian Handball Cup: 2010–11

References

External links
 

1978 births
Living people
Sportspeople from Novi Sad
Serbian male handball players
RK Sintelon players
RK Partizan players
TuS Nettelstedt-Lübbecke players
RK Vojvodina players
RK Jugović players
Handball-Bundesliga players
Liga ASOBAL players
Expatriate handball players
Serbian expatriate sportspeople in Germany
Serbian expatriate sportspeople in Spain
Serbian handball coaches